Stuart Ford is a British-born film and television producer based in Los Angeles.

In February 2018 Ford launched AGC Studios, an international film and television production and global licensing company that develops, produces, finances and globally licenses a diverse portfolio of feature films, scripted, unscripted and factual television, digital, and musical content from its dual headquarters in Los Angeles and London. The studio’s Hollywood output has a wide-ranging multicultural focus, designed for exploitation across an array of global platforms including major studio partnerships, streaming platforms, traditional broadcast and cable television networks, and independent distributors, both in the US and internationally.
 
In addition to having produced or executive produced over 60 feature films and TV shows Ford is one of the film industry’s leading experts on international film distribution and has launched and overseen content companies in the US, the UK, France, China, Hong Kong, India and Mexico.
  
Ford is a member of the Academy of Motion Picture Arts and Sciences as well as the British Academy of Film and Television Arts.

Professional career 
Ford is a former entertainment attorney and studio executive who in 2018 founded AGC Studios, which has already established itself as one of the most high profile independent film and television production, financing, and global sales platforms in the industry. With significant backing from Silicon Valley, Latin America, and the Middle East. AGC has offices in Los Angeles and London and so far has been involved with 27 major film and television productions with combined production budgets in excess of $1 billion, including all four of the $100m+ budgeted feature films financed outside of the major studio and streamer system in the past five years. 

In 2007 Ford founded IM Global, which over the next ten years he built into one of the industry’s leading independent film and television production, financing and sales platforms. As Founder and CEO of the company, Ford produced or distributed films that involved directors and actors including Martin Scorsese, Barbara Broccoli, Julia Roberts, Liam Neeson, Keanu Reeves, Johnny Depp, Mel Gibson, Lima Neeson, Will Ferrell, Nicole Kidman, Tom Hanks, Tom Ford and Madonna from his network of offices in Los Angeles, New York, London, Mexico City, Munich, Mumbai and Beijing. Ford and IM Global also became prominent players in the Bollywood, Chinese and Latin American film sectors. The company produced and financed over 30 feature films of its own as well as handling international sales on more than one hundred first run feature films and handling a library of over 600 titles. The company also owned Mundial, a leading Latino sales and financing company; operated one of the premier international sales platforms for Chinese cinema; and operated Valor Entertainment, a multicultural talent management group. In addition, as a joint venture with Chinese internet giant Tencent, the company operated IM Global Television, a full service scripted and unscripted television production, financing and distribution studio. 
 
Before IM Global, Ford was a long serving executive at Miramax Films in New York where, in various executive capacities he was involved in the acquisition and/or production of numerous Academy Award recognized films including Shakespeare in Love, Chicago (2002 film), The Cider House Rules (film), Chocolat (2000 film), Gangs Of New York, and Amélie. During this period The Hollywood Reporter listed Ford as one of the top executives in Hollywood under the age of 35. He began his career in the early nineties as an entertainment industry lawyer at UK law firm Olswang.

Ford has been a recipient of Variety’s Achievement in International Film Award, has been listed by the UK’s Guardian newspaper as one of the 50 Most Influential People in Global Cinema and is a member of the Academy of Motion Picture Arts and Sciences, BAFTA, and the Paley Center for Media. In 2021 Ford was listed amongst the Variety500, “an index of the 500 most influential business leaders shaping the global media industry.”

Personal life
Ford was educated at the Liverpool Blue Coat School, and later obtained both a BA and an MA in Law from St. Edmund Hall, Oxford University.

Ford lives in Los Angeles with his wife and two sons.

Awards
 50 most influential individuals in global cinema: Stuart Ford - The Guardian 2010 
 Variety Award for Achievement in International Film: Stuart Ford, IM Global - Variety 2015 
Academy of Motion Pictures Arts and Sciences, Executive Member: Stuart Ford - 2017 
Variety 500, 500 Most Important People in Global Media: Stuart Ford - 2021

Filmography 
 Demonic - producer
 Geechee - producer
 Voyagers (film) - executive producer
 The Secrets We Keep (2020) - producer
 The Rhythm Section (2020) - executive producer
 War of the Worlds (2019 TV series) - executive producer
 Midway (2019 film) - executive producer
 Serenity (2019 film) - executive producer
 The Professor (2018 film) (2018) - executive producer
 Boarding School (2018 film) - executive producer
 Zoe (film) (2018) - executive producer
 Hacksaw Ridge (2016) - executive producer 
 Free State of Jones (film) (2016) - executive producer 
 Silence (2016 film) (2016) - executive producer 
 Incarnate (film) (2016) - executive producer 
 The Autopsy of Jane Doe (2016) - executive producer 
 Viral (film) (2016) - executive producer 
 Collide (film) (2016) - executive producer 
 Fifty Shades of Black (2016) - executive producer 
 Southside With You (2016) - executive producer
 Secret in Their Eyes (2015) - executive producer
 Area 51 (film) (2015) - executive producer
 Grace: The Possession (2014) - executive producer
 Revenge of the Green Dragons (2014) - producer
 Enchanted Kingdom 3D (2014) (Documentary) - executive producer
 A Haunted House 2 (2014) - executive producer
 13 Sins (2014) - executive producer
 Vampire Academy (film) (2014) - executive producer
 Justin Bieber's Believe (2013) (Documentary) - producer
 Walking with Dinosaurs 3D (2013)  - executive producer
 Plush (film) (2013) - producer
 Afflicted (film) (2013) - executive producer
 Locke (film) (2013) executive producer
 The Sacrament (2013 film) (2013) - executive producer
 Paranoia (2013 film) (2013) - executive producer
 Hummingbird (film) (2013) - executive producer
 Dead Man Down (2013) - executive producer
 Welcome to the Punch (2013) - executive producer
 A Haunted House (2013) - executive producer
 Bullet to the Head (2012) - executive producer
 Blood (2012 film) (2012) - executive producer
 Dredd (2012) - executive producer
 Safe (2012 film) (2012) - executive producer
 The Babymakers (2012) - executive producer
 44 Inch Chest (2009) - executive producer
 Goal! III (2009) (Video) - executive producer
 Goal II: Living the Dream (2007) - executive producer
 The Official Film of the 2006 FIFA World Cup (TM) (2006) (Video documentary) - executive producer
 Summer Love (2006 film) (2006) - executive producer

References 

Living people
American film producers
American chief executives
Alumni of St Edmund Hall, Oxford
People educated at Liverpool Blue Coat School
Year of birth missing (living people)
American independent film production company founders